

Incumbents
 Monarch – Margrethe II
 Prime Minister – Lars Løkke Rasmussen

Events
 Kundby case Failed Islamist terror bombing plot.
 28 November – The third cabinet of Lars Løkke Rasmussen is presented at Amalienborg Palace.

Culture

Film
 20 February – Trine Dyrholm wins the Silver Bear for Best Actress for her role in Thomas Vinterberg's The Commune at the 66th Berlin International Film Festival.

Sport

Badminton
 26 April1 May – With four gold medals, three silver medals and four bronze medals, Denmark finishes as the best nation at the 2016 European Badminton Championships.
 22 May  Denmark wins the 2016 Thomas & Uber Cup by defeating Indonesia 32 in the final.

Golf
 6 November – Thorbjørn Olesen wins Turkish Airlines Open.

Ice hockey
 March 25–31 – 2016 IIHF Women's World Championship Division I Group A in Aalborg

Other
 20–27 August – Maja Alm wins a gold medal in Women's sprint and Denmark wins two silver medals in  Mixed sprint relay and Women's relay at the 2016 World Orienteering Championships-

Deaths
 3 January – Peter Naur, computer scientist (born 1928)
 18 January – Else Marie Pade, composer (born 1924) 
 8 February – Viggo Rivad, photographer (born 1922)
 20 February – Ove Verner Hansen, actor (born 1932)
 20 March – Anker Jørgensen, politician and former prime minister of Denmark (born 1922)
 22 April – Anne Wolden-Ræthinge, journalist (born 1929)
 8 July – Gurli Vibe Jensen, missionary, priest and writer (born 1924)
 1 September – Grethe Philip, politician (born 1916)

See also
2016 in Danish television

References

 
2010s in Denmark
Years of the 21st century in Denmark
Denmark
Denmark